Clara Franzini-Armstrong (born 1938 Florence) is an Italian-born American electron microscopist, and Professor Emeritus of Cell and Developmental Biology at University of Pennsylvania.

Early life
Clara Franzini was born on October 3, 1938, in Florence, Italy, along with her twin brother. Franzini-Armstrong was born one year before World War II, so she vaguely recalls spending the worst of the war in a hill village. She lived with her mother, father, and three brothers, Paolo, Carlo, and Marco. The part of her childhood that occurred after the war consisted of competing with her brothers on exhausting mountain hikes, roller skating in Piazzale Michelangelo, observing the entire beautiful city, and long relaxing times in scenic settings like the Dolomites. Furthermore, Franzini-Armstrong strongly remembers the constant protection and affection that her twin brother showed her as they were growing up.  

Throughout her years of schooling, Franzini-Armstrong always studied very hard.  She was driven, curious and very interested in the field of science. Her parents were first-generation scientists. Franzini-Armstrong and her three brothers always knew that they wanted to pursue careers in science. Their father was an atomic physicist, and he was very passionate about teaching, especially regarding his children. Their mother was one of the very few women of that time who earned her physics degree. Franzini-Armstrong's mother did not pursue a science career as she spent most of her time at home raising her four children. However, Franzini-Armstrong's mother always strongly encouraged her to pursue a science career. Franzini-Armstrong reports, “She [mother] gave me total equality with my brothers in all academic questions." All three of Franzini-Armstrong's brothers pursued science careers. Her brother Paolo became a particle physicist; Carlo a medical physician who constructed the first interference microscope ​in Pisa; and Marco, an accomplished mineralogist.

Education
In 1956, Franzini-Armstrong enrolled in the biological sciences program at the University of Pisa, and she graduated with her Ph.D. degree in 1960. She was presented with numerous extraordinary opportunities at Pisa. For instance, the Ministry of Education gave the first electron microscope to the University of Pisa, which allowed Franzini-Armstrong access to it and sparked her passion for microscopy. Moreover, Pathology Department Chair Puccinelli gave Franzini-Armstrong a book and sent her to Rome for multiple days to visit an EM lab, which gave her the chance to learn electron microscopy. She wrote her first EM thesis at the University of Pisa.

Later, Franzini-Armstrong was encouraged by Pellegrino, one of her professors, to study and observe changes induced by denervation ​on skeletal muscle. Ever since she has worked with skeletal and cardiac muscle during her electron microscopy studies. She has continually conducted electron microscopy studies for the past 50 years. Additionally, Keith R. Porter offered Franzini-Armstrong postdoctoral training in his laboratory at Harvard University. She reports that this opportunity opened doors to an entirely new world of cell biology and advanced electron microscopy for her. Franzini-Armstrong described Porter as a very charismatic teacher and friend. Her first large milestone discovery took place two weeks before she left the lab. The first major discovery of Franzini-Armstrong's was that transverse tubules open at the cell surface, and this is an essential discovery in understanding how muscle is activated to contract. 

There are numerous additional scientists that greatly helped and influenced Franzini-Armstrong's work, including Richard Podolsky, Sir Andrew Huxley, and Paul Horowitz. From 1963 – 1964, Franzini-Armstrong worked as Richard Podolsky's research assistant at the National Institutes of Health, and he improved her foundation on the physiology of muscle activation. From 1964 – 1966, Franzini-Armstrong worked in Sir Andrew Huxley's lab, and there she began to fully comprehend contractile machinery and appreciate optics. Additionally, she began to learn how to best deal with the difficulties that accompany the early stages of raising a family while working in the field of science. Moreover, from 1967 – 1975, Paul Horowitz helped Franzini-Armstrong with her big transition from trainee to a faculty member at the University of Rochester. Horowitz provided her with the freedom to pursue a career in science without the responsibilities of committee work or heavy teaching while her children were still young.

Degrees, Professional Experience, and Career
Franzini-Armstrong's primary interest in science has been the disposition of membranes and macromolecular complexes that are responsible for excitation-contraction​ (e-c) coupling in cardiac and skeletal muscles. She engaged in four main phases of structural work in terms of her career.  Her first phase focused on calcium cycling and, especially, on defining the distribution and nature of the two membrane systems involved in this specific type of cycling. Franzini-Armstrong's second phase discovered the location of channels that release calcium during muscle activation. She also demonstrated that in muscles that can engage in high activity rates, a limiting factor is the density of the pump protein and not the density of calcium release channels. Furthermore, the third phase of Franzini-Armstrong's structural work recognized the relationship between the L type calcium channels of the plasmalemma and T tubules in cardiac and skeletal muscles. Specifically, she worked with CaV channels or dihydropyridine receptors (DHPRs) and the calcium release channels of the sarcoplasmic reticulum (RyRs). Her fourth phase, which continues to be her current interest, is the supramolecular complex that enables several molecules located in the sarcoplasmic reticulum that regulate calcium release to interact with one another. In her current work, Franzini-Armstrong continues to utilize structural approaches in order to better comprehend the different interactions between molecules.

Numerous people, including her students and colleagues, are constantly inspired by Franzini-Armstrong and all the work that she does. Simona Boncompagni, a researcher at the D'Annunzio University of Chieti–Pescara in Italy describes Franzini-Armstrong as, “a scientist with strong determination and humanity at the same time." Boncompagni states, “her [Franzini-Armstrong] career is characterized by high scientific achievements and immense productivity, but she is always open to new collaborations." Paul Allen agrees as he explains, “on a bench at a Biophysical Society meeting 13 years ago, she single-handedly saved my career as a scientist and helped create one of the most successful multi-center group collaborations that ever existed. I knew who Clara was from her extraordinary reputation as the world’s premier expert in muscle histology and ultra-structure. What I could not imagine was that she would want to collaborate with me!"

Franzini-Armstrong earned multiple degrees and gained a great deal of professional experience throughout her many years of education and research. She earned her Laurea degree, which is a first-cycle degree that is equivalent to a bachelor's degree, in biological sciences, at the University of Pisa, Italy from 1956 – 1960. From 1960 – 1961, Franzini-Armstrong worked as an assistant professor of pathology at the University of Pisa. Then, she went on to earn her postdoctoral degree in cell biology at Harvard University as she worked in Dr. K. R. Porter's biology lab from 1961 – 1963. Then, from 1963 – 1964, she worked at the National Institutes of Health with Dr. R. J. Podolsky and earned a master of research degree in muscle physiology. From 1964 – 1966, Franzini-Armstrong worked as a research assistant at the University College, London, with Prof. A. F. Huxley and earned another master of research degree in muscle structure. From 1967 – 1969, she worked as a research associate in physiology at Duke University.  Then, from 1969 – 1972, Franzini-Armstrong worked as an associate in physiology at the University of Rochester. She was an assistant professor in physiology at the University of Rochester from 1972 – 1975. After that, from 1975 – 1981, Franzini-Armstrong was an associate professor of anatomy at the University of Pennsylvania. From 1981 – 1992, she worked as a professor in anatomy at the University of Pennsylvania. Then, she worked as a professor in cell and developmental biology at the University of Pennsylvania from 1992 – 2007.

From 2007 to the present day, Franzini-Armstrong, Ph.D., has been working as an Emeritus Professor of Cell and Developmental Biology at the Perelman School of Medicine of the University of Pennsylvania.  Her husband, Clay Armstrong, MD, has been working as an Emeritus Professor of Physiology at the Perelman School of Medicine of the University of Pennsylvania. Both Clara Franzini-Armstrong and Clay Armstrong are members of the National Academy of Sciences, and they are the only married couple to hold that high honor. Additionally, the five decades of research that Clara Franzini-Armstrong and Clay Armstrong have done has recently been recognized by their professional society—the Society of General Physiologists—with a named lecture series. Clara Franzini-Armstrong's work has primarily been focused on electron microscopy of the inner workings of cells, specifically the structural bases of excitation-contraction coupling. Clay Armstrong's work has been centered on ion channel permeability mechanisms and gating processes in cell membranes. A 2003 Nobel laureate in Chemistry, Rob MacKinnon, presented the inaugural keynote in a lecture series at this year's annual meeting, which is usually held at the Marine Biological Laboratory in Woods Hole, Massachusetts. Furthermore, in 2014, two additional Nobel laureates, Linda Buck and Martin Chalfie, delivered the now-annual Society's Friends of Physiology Lecture Series Honoring Clara Franzini-Armstrong and Clay Armstrong. Today, both Clara Franzini-Armstrong and Clay Armstrong continue to add significant new knowledge to the field of science with their ongoing laboratory work and research publications. Also, both continue to contribute with their commitment to teaching and educating the upcoming generation of scientists.

Personal life
Franzini-Armstrong is married to Clay Armstrong, a channel electrophysiologist and professor of physiology at the University of Pennsylvania. They have one son, John, and three daughters, Katie, Sandra, and Cecilia.

Honors and awards
Franzini-Armstrong is a very decorated scientist as she has won numerous honors and awards throughout her career. For starters, from 1956 – 1960 in Pisa, Italy, she held the honor of Fellowship: Scuola Normale Superiore, and from 1990 – 1961 in Pisa, Italy, she held the honor of “Perfezionamento” (postdoctoral fellowship), Scuola Normale Superiore. From 1983 -1987, she held the honor of being a member of the Molecular Cytology Study Section.  Furthermore, in 1988, Franzini-Armstrong was awarded the position of director of the Gordon Research Conference on Excitation-Contraction Coupling. From 1988 – 1990, she held the honor of being a member of the Scientific Advisory Committee and the Muscular Dystrophy Association. Additionally, from 1988 – 1990, she was a council member of the Biophysical Society. In 1989, Franzini-Armstrong was the co-recipient with Dr. Knox Chandler of the K.C. Cole Award of the Biophysical Society. Moreover, in 1990, she was honored with the position of co-chairman of the Biophysical Society Symposium on Excitation-Contraction Coupling. Additionally, in 1995, Franzini-Armstrong was inducted into the National Academy of Sciences. In 1997, she was awarded an honorary MD from the University of Pisa, Italy. In 2001, Franzini-Armstrong was inducted into the Royal Society London as a foreign member. In 2005, she was inducted into the European Academy of Sciences. Also, in 2007, Franzini-Armstrong was awarded the Founder's Award for the Biophysical Society.

References

1938 births
Scientists from Florence
Italian emigrants to the United States
University of Pisa alumni
University of Pennsylvania faculty
Microscopists
Living people
Foreign Members of the Royal Society
Members of the United States National Academy of Sciences
21st-century American biologists
Italian biologists